George Graham  (1882–1971) was a British physician, physiologist, and diabetologist.

After education at St Paul's School, London, George Graham matriculated at Trinity College, Cambridge, where he graduated BA in 1904. After studying medicine at St Bartholomew's Hospital and qualifying MRCS, LRCP in 1907, he graduated from the University of Cambridge with MB BChir in 1908 and MD in 1912. 

Supported by a Beit Memorial Fellowship, he worked from 1912 to 1914 at the Institute of Physiology in Munich on the protein-sparing action of carbohydrates. During WWI he was associated with Sir Archibald Garrod. Graham was a captain in the RAMC from 1916 to 1919. After demobilisation, he was appointed assistant physician to the Royal Northern Hospital. In 1920 he was elected FRCP and began working at St Bartholomew Hospital's newly established medical professorial unit, which was directed by Francis Fraser after Sir Archibald Garrod went to Oxford. At St Bartholomew's Hospital, Graham was influenced by William Holdsworth Hurtley and Sir Archibald Garrod, who was a consulting physician at several hospitals. Graham studied the physiology and biochemistry of diabetes. He was the first researcher in the UK to show that blood sugar increases after food intake. He was the first to describe renal glycosuria.

At St Bartholomew's Hospital, he was appointed in 1924 assistant physician and in 1932 full physician, upon the retirement of Sir Percival Horton Smith Hartley. Graham retired in 1946.

The Royal College of Physicians chose him as the Goulstonian Lecturer (1921), the Croonian Lecturer (1940), and the Harveian Orator (1953). Under the auspices of the Medical Society of London in 1938 he delivered that year's Lettsomian Lectures on diabetes and its treatment. He was the Royal Institute of Public Health's Harben Lecturer for 1949; as such, he gave in January 1950 three lectures on diabetes.

Selected publications
with J. Bancroft and H. L. Higgins: 
with E. P. Poulton: 
 (What Graham calls the 'leak-point' in diabetes is now called the renal threshold for glucose.)

References

1882 births
1971 deaths
British diabetologists
20th-century English medical doctors
People educated at St Paul's School, London
Alumni of Trinity College, Cambridge
Alumni of the Medical College of St Bartholomew's Hospital
Fellows of the Royal College of Physicians